Burrows is a provincial electoral division in the Canadian province of Manitoba. It was created by redistribution in 1957 from part of Winnipeg North, and formally came into existence in the provincial election of 1958.  The riding is located in the northern part of Winnipeg.

Burrows is named after Theodore Arthur Burrows, who served as Lieutenant-Governor of Manitoba from 1926 to 1929. It is bordered to the east by St. Johns and Point Douglas, to the south by Wellington, to the north by Kildonan and The Maples, and to the west by Tyndall Park. The riding's boundaries were significantly redrawn in 1999, taking in a considerable amount of territory which was previously a part of the now-defunct Inkster.

The riding's population in 1996 was 18,718. In 1999, the average family income was $35,575, one of the lowest rates in the province. Thirty-nine per cent of the riding's residents are listed as low-income, with an unemployment rate of 13%. One household in four has only one parent. Nineteen per cent of the riding's residents are over sixty-five years of age.

The total immigrant population in Burrows is 21%, with almost one in three residents speaking a first language other than English or French. The Aboriginal population is 15%.

Manufacturing accounts for 22% of Burrows' industry, with a further 15% in the service sector.

The CCF and its successor the NDP have won Burrows on all but three occasions since the riding was created, with the Liberals winning the other three elections.

List of provincial representatives

Electoral results

1958 general election

1959 general election

1962 general election

1966 general election

1969 general election

1973 general election

1977 general election

1981 general election

1986 general election

1988 general election

1990 general election

1995 general election

1999 general election

2003 general election

2007 general election

2011 general election

2016 general election

2019 general election

Previous boundaries

References

Manitoba provincial electoral districts
Politics of Winnipeg